Niall Macfarlane Mackenzie (born 19 July 1961) is a Scottish former professional motorcycle road racer.

Career

Mackenzie, who hails from Fankerton, near Denny, Stirlingshire; won the British Superbike Championship three times from 1996 to 1998 with the Rob McElnea-run Yamaha team, and the British 250cc and 350cc titles twice earlier in his career. He had a long career in the Grand Prix motorcycle racing circuit, debuting in 1984 in the 250cc class. He moved up to the 500cc class in 1986 on a Suzuki before spells on Honda and Yamaha motorcycles. He was 4th in the championship in 1990, and finished in the top 10 in the championship on five other occasions. His final racing season was the 2000 British Superbike series, although he did a farewell one-off at Knockhill in 2001 and stood in for the injured Yukio Kagayama at Donington Park in 2003.

Post-racing career
Mackenzie co-owns Mackenzie Hodgson Insurance, works in motorcycling media and instructs on track days around the UK and Europe.

Personal life
Mackenzie has two sons; Tarran, who competes in the British Superbike Championship, and Taylor, who competed in Superstock 1000 before his retirement from competition after the 2021 season. Taylor won the British Superstock 1000cc Championship in 2016. Tarran won the British Supersport Championship in 2016 and the British Superbike Championship in 2021.

Grand Prix career statistics

Points system from 1969 to 1987:

Points system from 1988 to 1991:

Points system in 1992:

Points system from 1993 onwards:

(key) (Races in bold indicate pole position; races in italics indicate fastest lap)

References

External links
 Niall-Mackenzie.com – Official site
 Video interview with Niall Mackenzie, Donington Park, 2005

1961 births
Living people
British motorcycle racers
Scottish motorcycle racers
500cc World Championship riders
250cc World Championship riders
British Superbike Championship riders
Superbike World Championship riders